The 2010–11 Air21 Express season was the ninth season of the franchise in the Philippine Basketball Association (PBA).

Key dates
August 29: The 2010 PBA Draft took place in Fort Bonifacio, Taguig.

Draft picks

Roster

Philippine Cup

Eliminations

Standings

Commissioner's Cup

Eliminations

Standings

Governors Cup

Eliminations

Standings

Transactions

Pre-season

Trades

Free agents

Subtractions

Philippine Cup

Trades

Commissioner's Cup

Trades

Free agents

Additions

Governors Cup

Recruited imports

References

Barako Bull Energy seasons
Air21